Dicarpa is a genus of ascidian tunicates in the family Styelidae.

Species 
Species within the genus Dicarpa include:
 Dicarpa antarctica Monniot & Monniot, 1977 
 Dicarpa atlantica Millar, 1964 
 Dicarpa cornicula (Monniot, 1978) 
 Dicarpa fibrata Monniot, 1997 
 Dicarpa insinuosa (Sluiter, 1912) 
 Dicarpa intritae Monniot & Monniot, 1976 
 Dicarpa lata Monniot & Monniot, 1976 
 Dicarpa mysogyna Monniot & Monniot, 1982 
 Dicarpa pacifica Millar, 1964 
 Dicarpa simplex Millar, 1955 
 Dicarpa spinifera Monniot & Monniot, 1976 
 Dicarpa tricostata (Millar, 1960)

Species names currently considered to be synonyms:
 Dicarpa mysogyna Monniot & Monniot, 1983: synonym of Dicarpa mysogyna Monniot & Monniot, 1982

References

Stolidobranchia
Tunicate genera